The Troubles in Ardboe recounts incidents during and the effects of the Troubles in Ardboe, County Tyrone, Northern Ireland.

Incidents in Ardboe during the Troubles resulting fatalities:

1972
16 October 1972 - Patrick Mullan (34) and Hugh Herron (38), both Catholic members of the Official Irish Republican Army, were shot and killed by the British Army while stationary in a car, outside St Patrick's Hall, Ardboe, three miles outside Coagh.

1977
2 June 1977 - Hugh Martin (58), Samuel Davidson (24) and Norman Lynch (22), all Protestant members of the Royal Ulster Constabulary, were shot dead by Provisional Irish Republican Army snipers while on mobile patrol near Ardboe.

1978
26 February 1978 - Paul Duffy (23), a Catholic Volunteer of the Irish Republican Army (IRA), was shot by an undercover British Army (BA) SAS member at an arms dump in an unoccupied farmhouse, near Ardboe. Another IRA Volunteer was injured in the attack but survived. This was the first time the SAS had been used in action outside of South Armagh.

1979
22 June 1979 - John "Jack" Scott (49), a Protestant off-duty reserve police office was shot by the Irish Republican Army while delivering milk in Ardboe.

1984
13 July 1984 - William Price (28), a Catholic member of the Irish Republican Army, was ambushed by the SAS  during an attempted incendiary bomb attack on Forbes factory in Ardboe.

1988
26 April 1988 - Edward "Ned" Gibson (22), a Protestant off-duty member of the Ulster Defence Regiment (UDR), was shot by the Provisional Irish Republican Army while working as a bin man in Moortown, near Ardboe.
On 30 November 1989, Liam Ryan was shot dead in the Battery Bar by the UVF. Civilians Michael Devlin also died and Pat Campbell received life changing injuries as the result of the shootings

References

External links
NI Conflict Archive on the Internet

Military history of County Tyrone
Ardboe